Frank E. Johnson A.S.C. is an American cinematographer, producer and film director. He is best known for cinematography on The A-Team, but has also worked the camera for such feature films such as Predator (1987), The Taking of Beverly Hills (1991), and The Man in the Black Suit (2004). He was twice nominated for an ASC Award for "Outstanding Achievement in Cinematography", in 2000 and 2001. He has a film set for release in 2009 as producer and director for Shannon's Rainbow.

Filmography
As director:
Shannon's Rainbow (2009) (post-production)
Touched by an Angel (1994) TV series
Palace Guard (1991) TV series
Wiseguy (1987) TV series
As cinematographer:
Street 16 (2005)
The Man in the Black Suit (2004)
Water with Food Coloring (2001)
Savannah (1996) TV series
Alone in the Woods (1996)
Marker(1995) TV series
Touched by an Angel (1994) TV series
Backstreet Justice (1994)  Dead Wrong (Australia)
Walker, Texas Ranger (1993) TV series
Palace Guard (1991) TV series
Captive (1991) (TV)
The Taking of Beverly Hills (1991)
Police Story: Gladiator School (1988) (TV)
The A-Team (20 episodes, 1985–1986)
Heated Vengeance (1985)
Raw Force (1982) a.k.a. Kung Fu Cannibals (USA)
The Last Reunion (1980) a.k.a. Ninja Nightmare
Project: Kill (1976) (as Frank Johnson)

References

google.com Supernova Media, Inc. et al. v.Shannon's Rainbow LLC et al.-1 Defendants are Frank E. Johnson, Lawrence Richert, Joseph G. Pia, Charles Morrison, Kelly Nelson and John Mowod

External links

Year of birth missing (living people)
Living people
American cinematographers
American film directors
American film producers